PS Eleanor was a paddle steamer cargo vessel operated by the London and North Western Railway from 1881 to 1902.

History

She was built by Cammell Laird for the London and North Western Railway in 1881. She was very similar in specification to the paddle steamer Isabella of 1877.

She was put on the Holyhead - Greenore route to replace her namesake Eleanor which had been wrecked earlier in the same year.

References

1881 ships
Steamships
Ships built on the River Mersey
Ships of the London and North Western Railway
Paddle steamers of the United Kingdom